Zofia Rydet (May 5, 1911 – August 24, 1997) was a Polish photographer, best known for her project "Sociological Record", which aimed to document every household in Poland. She began working on "Sociological Record" in 1978 at the age of 67, and took nearly 20,000 pictures until her death in 1997. Many of the pictures remain undeveloped. The photographs are predominantly portraits of children, men, women, couples, families and the elderly amidst their belongings. Rydet tended to photograph her subjects straight-on, using a wide-angle lens and a flash.

Personal life
Rydet was born in Stanisławów. She attended the Główna Szkoła Gospodarcza Żeńska in Snopków. As a young woman she had a number of occupations such as working for the Orbis Polish Travel Office and running a stationery shop.

In mid-life she returned to her hobby of photography. She joined the Gliwice Photographic Society in 1954 and improved her skills.

Work

In 1961 Rydet had a major exhibition of photographs called Mały człowiek (Little Man). Rydet's intention for Little Man, was to show that children had good and bad experiences in their life, just like adults. She also wanted to depict how societal issues and policies can affect children. Rydet did not want to show children as a carefree stereotype, but rather as human.

In 1965 the works in this exhibition were collected into a book edited by Wojciech Zamecznik. The same year she became a member of the Union of Polish Art Photographers.

In Czas prezemianija (The Passage of Time, 1963-1977), Rydet portrays the dignity and grace of old age in a series of intimate portraits.
In 1976, Rydet was awarded the Excellence de la Fédération Internationale de l´Art Photographique (EFIAP).

In 1978, Rydet began her work on "Zapis Socjologiczny" ("Sociological Record"). The project consists of thousands of informal black and white photographs taken in ordinary households throughout Poland, particularly from the regions of Podhale, Upper Silesia and the Suwałki area.

During the final years of her life, because she was too weak to travel with her camera, Rydet turned to photographic collage as a medium, and modified her photographs by cutting them up and adding buttons, fabric, and dried flowers.

Rydet's first major exhibition of her Sociological Record took place in 2015 at the Museum of Modern Art, Warsaw, and the Jeu de Paume, Château de Tours.  Her photography can be found in the permanent collections of the Museum of Modern Art, New York, the Art Institute of Chicago, and the Centre Georges Pompidou, Paris, and the National Museum of Modern Art, Kyoto.

Rydet died in Gliwice on August 24, 1997.

References

Bibliography 

 Adam Mazur, 'Zofia Rydet, "Zapis, 1978-1990"', Szum : sztuka polska w rozszerzonym polu. Nr 11 (2015/2016), s. 159-161.
 Barbara Panek-Sarnowska, Socjologiczność fotografii Zofii Rydet, Zielona Góra : Lubuskie Towarzystwo Fiotograficzne, 2005. 
 Centre régional de la photographie Nord-Pas-de-Calais, Aspects de la photographie polonaise : Stanislaw Michalski, Zofia Rydet, Maciej Plewinski, Wojciech Prazmowski. Douchy-les-Mines : Centre régional de la photographie Nord Pas-de-Calais, [1988?] 
 Krzysztof Jurecki; Elżbieta Fuchs; Katarzyna Bilicka; Alina Kwiatkowska; Joanna Holzman; Muzeum Sztuki (Łódź), Zofia Rydet (1911-1997) : fotografie : Muzeum Sztuki w Łodzi, 2 czerwca 1999 - 31 lipca 1999, Łódź : Muzeum Sztuki, ; 1999. 
 Marcin Łakomski; Anda MacBride; Krzysztof Pijarski; Muzeum Sztuki Nowoczesnej (Warszawa), Object lessons : Zofia Rydet's "Sociological record", Warsaw : Museum of Modern Art, 2017. 
 Stefan Czyżewski; Mariusz Gołąb; Uniwersytet Łódzki. Wydawnictwo, Zofia Rydet po latach, 1978-2018, Łódź : Wydawnictwo Uniwersytetu Łódzkiego, 2020. 
 Zofia Rydet, Julia Staniszewska, Kryzsztof Kościuczuk, Galeria Asymetria (Warszawa), Zofia Rydet / Julia Staniszewska : mały człowiek - oczekiwanie, Warszawa : Fundacja Archeologia Fotografii, 2011. 
 Zofia Rydet, Wojciech Nowicki, Muzeum w Gliwicach, Zofia Rydet : Zapis socjologiczny 1978-1990, Gliwice : Muzeum w Gliwicach, [2017]. 

 
1911 births
1997 deaths
20th-century Polish women artists
20th-century women photographers
Polish photographers
Photographers from Lviv